Downtown Commercial Historic District or Downtown Historic District may refer to:
  
Downtown Commercial District (Bowling Green, Kentucky)
Downtown Commercial Historic District (Burlington, Iowa), listed on the National Register of Historic Places
Downtown Commercial District (Lexington, Kentucky), listed on the National Register of Historic Places
Downtown Commercial Historic District (Muscatine, Iowa)
Downtown Commercial Historic District (Paterson, New Jersey)

See also
Commercial Historic District (disambiguation)